A Franzbrötchen is a small, sweet pastry baked with butter and cinnamon, similar to a cinnamon roll. Sometimes other ingredients are used as well, such as chocolate or raisins. It is a type of pastry commonly found in northern Germany, especially Hamburg, and it is usually served for breakfast, but is also enjoyed along with coffee and cake. As its name indicates, the Franzbrötchen was probably inspired by French pastries. Originally, it could be found only in the region of Hamburg, but now Franzbrötchen are also sold in Bremen, Berlin, and other German cities.

Preparation
The ingredients of the dough include flour, butter, yeast, milk, sugar, and a pinch of salt. The filling is a mixture of sugar and cinnamon. Several times in succession, the dough is folded and rolled out thinly, and coated with butter. As soon as the dough is sufficiently outstretched to a filmy layer, it is moistened with a little water, sprinkled with a melange of sugar and cinnamon and finally rolled up. In order to provide the filled dough roll with the typical shape of a Franzbrötchen, it has to be cut into slices, each about four centimetres thick. Afterwards, the pieces are pressed together in the middle of the cut faces with the handle of a wooden spoon, which causes the filling to ooze out sideways. On baking, the yeast dough rises and the melange of sugar and cinnamon is slightly caramelized on the outside of the layers. Due to the butter and the caramelized sugar, the Franzbrötchen is often a little sticky. Variants of the Franzbrötchen may contain raisins, seeds, chocolate sprinkles or pumpkin seeds.

Origin
The Franzbrötchen was probably named in the style of the French (German 'französisch') model, the croissant, which is also made of pastry and became popular in Germany after Napoleon's troops had occupied Hamburg between 1806 and 1814. According to a different historical tradition, they produced a longish Franzbrot (German for 'French bread') which resembled the baguette. Legend has it, a baker in Hamburg had once seared such a Franzbrot in a pan of fat, which is considered the origin of the contemporary Franzbrötchen.

See also

 List of German desserts
 Cinnamon Roll

References

Further reading 
B. Henning, J. Meier: Kleines Hamburgisches Wörterbuch, Wachholt, 2006, 
M. Beseler, S. Ingwersen, A. Treichel: Das Franzbrötchen - Wunderbarer Plunder aus Hamburg, Franzbrötchen-Verlag, Hamburg 2004,

External links
 Recipe
 Spread of the Franzbrötchen

German pastries
Hamburg cuisine